Le Mesnil-le-Roi is a commune in the Yvelines department in the Île-de-France region in north-central France.

The name "Mesnil" comes from  meaning "little estate". The name "Le Mesnil-le-Roi" could be said "The King's small estate" (Francis I).

Geography 
Le Mesnil-le-Roi is situated between the Forest of Saint-Germain-en-Laye and the left bank of the River Seine. It is bordered by Maisons-Laffitte to the north, Le Pecq to the south and Saint-Germain-en-Laye to the west. To the east, the Seine separates it from Montesson. The communal land includes an equal part of an island in the Seine, the Île de la Borde.

Outside the town, conjoining with Maisons-Laffitte, the  commune includes a second major estate, Carrières-sous-Bois.

The commune is crossed in its southern part by the A14 autoroute, partly underground. This autoroute crosses the Seine on a viaduct of reinforced concrete, forming two parallel bridges.

History

Heraldry 

This coat of arms, adopted in 1952, derives from the La Salle family, the ancient landowners of Carrières-sous-Bois, and it was given to them by Francis I.

Administration

Demography

Culture 

The town participates in a Concours des villes et villages fleuris ("Towns and Villages in Bloom" competition) and in 2007 won two flowers.

Monuments

 Church of St Vincent: Church in the Flamboyant Gothic style, consecrated on 2 August 1587
 Château du Val, 17th Century, situated on the edge of the Forest of Saint-Germain-en-Laye, built by the architect Jules Hardouin-Mansart.
 The Orangery of the Château du Mesnil, situated in a protected zone of POS ND-EBC (Non-cultivable woodland)) which has been converted to 43 private houses
 Old abandoned mineshafts (Château du Mesnil, now demolished),  situated on the edge of the Orangery on the Rue de Général Leclerc
 Artificial caves (abandoned), ancient glaciers (abandoned) and ruins of canals (now abandoned) in the communal woodlands (Château du Mesnil, now demolished).

Twin towns
 England: Newmarket, Suffolk

Famous people
 Émile Littré, bought a house in Mesnil-le-Roi, which he styled "Ménil-le-Roi," in 1847, and stayed there until his death in 1881; it was here that he did the bulk of his work on his great Dictionnaire de la langue française (1872; supplement 1877)
 Augustin Henry-Lepaute, watchmaker
 Jacques Fath, tailor, born in Mesnil-le-Roi in 1912
 Serge Gainsbourg, until then Lucien Ginsburg, married Élisabeth Levitsky at Mesnil-le-Roi Town Hall on 3 November 1951. He worked at this time at the Maison Champsfleur (actually an old people's home) as an assistant to young Israeli children whose parents were victims of the Holocaust.
 Jeanne Bourin, novelist and media personality
 Louis Pauwels, journalist
 Jules Rein, Politician, mayor of Mesnil-le-Roi, originator of the canton of Maisons-Laffitte – Le Mesnil-le-Roi – Houilles.

Economy
 Residential community.

See also 
 
Communes of the Yvelines department

References

External links 
 
Website for "Bienvenue Maisons/Mesnil" (information for new residents of Maisons-Laffitte and Mesnil-Le-Roi)

Communes of Yvelines